Visniak was a brand of soft drinks made by the "Saturn-Visniak Beverage Co." in Sloan, New York; the name of the brand was taken from the Polish word "wiśnia" for "cherry". The company was founded in 1959, and closed in 2004, dissolving in 2009.

Description
The label of the bottle said: "Pure, Healthful, Refreshing Beverage. Made with purified water, pure cane sugar and citric acid. Made in a modern, sanitary daylight plant". Visniak had several flavors, including: Cherry, Birch Beer, Ginger Ale, Club Soda, Cream Soda, Cola, Diet Cola, and Grapefruit drink. The sizes were 7½ oz splits  and 23.5 ounce bottles.

Company

The company closed in 2004. The bottles could be returned, as there was a 20 cent deposit on each bottle. It is believed that the company's downfall came about because people were not returning the bottles, thus making it necessary to constantly buy new ones and cut into the profit margin. The Visniak bottles are considered collectible.

References

Carbonated drinks
Companies based in New York (state)
1959 establishments in New York (state)
2004 disestablishments in New York (state)